Sheikha Al-Mayassa bint Hamad bin Khalifa Al Thani (born 1983) is the sister of Qatar's ruling Emir Tamim bin Hamad Al Thani, and daughter of the country's Father Emir Hamad bin Khalifa Al Thani and his second wife Moza bint Nasser Al-Missned. Al-Mayassa was declared the most influential person in art on Art+Auction's top-10 list and ArtReview's Power 100, and prominently appears on the Time 100, and Forbes' The World's 100 Most Powerful Women. She was listed in the 'Top 100 most powerful Arabs' from 2014 to 2017 and 2021 by Gulf Business. Al-Mayassa serves as Chairperson of Qatar Museums, and it was reported by Bloomberg that her annual acquisition budget on behalf of the organization is estimated at $1 billion.

Al-Mayassa reportedly bought Paul Gauguin's When Will You Marry? in 2015 for $300 million, a record price for a painting. In March 2016, she opened the exhibition What About the Art? A New Exhibition curated by Chinese artist Cai Guo-Qiang at Al Riwaq Gallery. Qatar has bought Cezanne's The Card Players in 2012 for $250 million, as well as Mark Rothko's White Center (Yellow, Pink and Lavender on Rose) in 2007 for $70 million, a Damien Hirst pill cabinet for $20 million and works by Jeff Koons, Andy Warhol, Roy Lichtenstein and Francis Bacon. She has staged major exhibitions in Qatar with Takashi Murakami, Richard Serra and Damien Hirst.

Education
Sheikha Al-Mayassa graduated with a B.A. degree in political science and literature from Duke University (Durham, North Carolina, USA) in 2005.

During the 2003–2004 school year, she studied at the University of Paris 1 Pantheon-Sorbonne, and the Institut d'Études Politiques de Paris (known as Sciences Po).

Career

Upon graduation, Sheikha al-Mayassa established the NGO Reach Out To Asia. This organization is a philanthropic effort inspired by the desire to help the victims of recent natural disasters in Asia by providing quality education; it also celebrated the occasion of the 2006 Asian Games in Doha.

Sheikha Al-Mayassa is the chairperson of Qatar Museums, whose former CEO Edward Dolman had previously served as Chairman of Christie's International, and responsible for cultivating significant cultural events in the region. She has been profiled extensively in The New York Times.

Sheikha Al-Mayassa is chairperson of the Doha Film Institute (DFI), which she founded in 2010. The institute partnered with the Tribeca Film Festival to produce several annual iterations of the Doha Tribeca Film Festival. In February 2013, they announced a $100 million feature film fund with Participant Media, a production company founded by billionaire Jeffrey Skoll, who was the first employee and first president of internet auction firm eBay.

Fashion Trust Arabia (FTA) launched in September 2018 under the patronage of HH Sheikha Moza bint Nasser as honorary chair and co-chaired by HE Sheikha Al-Mayassa bint Hamad Al-Thani and Tania Fares (Founder of Fashion Trust). FTA is the only initiative of its kind operating in the Arab world, dedicated to finding and nurturing talented designers. She is a member of the board of trustees at Qatar Foundation. In 2018, she was named to a three-year term on the Rhode Island School of Design board of trustees.

She is a member of the Leadership Council of  The Democracy & Culture Foundation.

Art collecting

Sheikha Al-Mayassa's wealth and role as Chairperson of Qatar Museums make her influential among art collectors. Bloomberg reported her acquisition budget on behalf of Qatar Museums is estimated at $1 billion annually.

Sheikha Al-Mayassa is said to have purchased the most expensive painting in the world, Paul Gauguin's When Will You Marry? in 2015 for $300 million, Cezanne's The Card Players in 2012 for $250 million, as well as Mark Rothko's White Center (Yellow, Pink and Lavender on Rose) in 2007 for $70 million, a Damien Hirst pill cabinet for $20 million and works by Jeff Koons, Andy Warhol, Roy Lichtenstein and Francis Bacon. She has staged major exhibitions in Qatar with Takashi Murakami, Richard Serra and Damien Hirst (underwriting his exhibit first at the Tate Modern prior to opening in Doha). The Sheikha oversees a vast array of museums including the I. M. Pei-designed Museum of Islamic Art, Doha, which opened in November 2008, and the Jean Nouvel-designed National Museum of Qatar, which opened in March 2019. The Orientalist Museum by Herzog & de Meuron is slated to open in the coming year.

Sheikha Al-Mayassa participated in a TED Talk in February 2012, where she highlighted the importance of the social impact of art. She affirmed that her goal was to create a local collection of art to contribute in shaping the Qatari national identity.

Family 
Sheikha Mayassa is the sister of the Emir of Qatar, Sheikh Tamim bin Hamad Al Thani. Her father Sheikh Hamad bin Khalifa Al-Thani is the former Emir, and mother Sheikha Moza bint Nasser Al-Missned, the former First Lady.

Sheikha Mayassa's mother Sheikha Moza is responsible for opening campuses of several world-class academic institutions in Doha, including Virginia Commonwealth University, Carnegie Mellon University, Georgetown University, Northwestern University, Texas A&M University and Weill Cornell Medical College and the University of Calgary in Qatar.

Her brother Sheikh Mohammed bin Hamad bin Khalifa Al Thani is the Chairman of Qatar's winning bid to stage the 2022 FIFA World Cup in Doha.

Sheikha Al-Mayassa's father former Emir of Qatar from 1995 to 2013, Sheikh Hamad bin Khalifa Al Thani, established the Qatar Investment Authority, a sovereign wealth fund to manage the country's oil and natural gas surpluses. The Qatar Investment Authority and its subsidiaries have acquired many businesses abroad, including London's iconic department store Harrods from entrepreneur Mohammed Al-Fayed, Paris based department store Printemps, a 75% stake in film studio Miramax, a 2% stake in media conglomerate and Universal Music Group parent company Vivendi, a 1% stake in luxury goods manufacturer Louis Vuitton Moët Hennessy and several other major companies.

Marriage and children
Sheikha Al-Mayassa married  Sheikh Jassim bin Abdulaziz Al Thani at Al-Wajbah Palace, Doha, on 6 January 2006.  Sheikh Jassim is an elder son of Sheikh Abdul Aziz bin Jassim bin Hamad Al Thani, making them second cousins. Together they have four sons and one daughter.

 Sheikh Mohammed bin Jassim bin Abdulaziz Al Thani.
 Sheikh Hamad bin Jassim bin Abdulaziz Al Thani.
 Sheikh Abdulaziz bin Jassim bin Abdulaziz Al Thani.
 Sheikha Norah bint Jassim bin Abdulaziz Al Thani
 Sheikh Tamim bin Jassim bin Abdulaziz Al Thani.

Ancestry

References

External links
 Muslim Women: Past and Present about Al-Thani
 
 "Globalizing the local, localizing the global" (TEDWomen 2010)

1983 births
Living people
Al-Mayassa bint Hamad bin Khalifa
Duke University Trinity College of Arts and Sciences alumni
Sciences Po alumni
Qatari art collectors
Museum directors
Women museum directors
Women art collectors
Daughters of monarchs